VST & Company (commonly abbreviated as VST & Co. or simply VST) is a Filipino disco band from Manila, Philippines, founded by Vic Sotto, Spanky Rigor, and Tito Sotto. Hailed as one of the most successful Filipino bands of the late 1970s, the group is considered by many to be one of the original proponents of OPM. The band originally consisted of Spanky Rigor, Roger Rigor, Male Rigor, Celso Llarina, Monet Gaskell, Val Sotto and Jun Medina. They pioneered the Manila sound genre along with bands such as Hotdog and Cinderella, and rose to fame with their first hit song, "Awitin Mo at Isasayaw Ko". The song ignited Philippine disco culture, and sparked "VST Mania"; a craze that swept across the country throughout the late 1970s. Their five albums which host a catalogue of hits such as "Rock Baby Rock", "Swing It Baby", "Disco Fever", "Magsayawan", "Kiss Kiss", "Magnifica" and "Step No, Step Yes", plus three critically acclaimed full-length films, Disco Fever (1978), Swing It… Baby (1979) and Rock Baby, Rock (1979), hallmark the band's cultural influence and historical contributions to contemporary Philippine pop music.

History
VST & Company was conceptualized by comedian Tito Sotto, whose initials came from his formal name Vicente Sotto, the Third, then vice president at Vicor Music Corporation, in response to the success of the song "Dahil Mahal Kita" by the Boyfriends. In a 2011 interview with Arnold Clavio, Sotto tells the story of hearing the Boyfriends tune being sung by a waitress, which gave him the impetus to create a better hit:

In a mini documentary special by ASAP, featuring artists that gave birth to the Manila sound movement, which then led to the beginnings of OPM (Original Pilipino Music), Male Rigor confirms Tito Sotto's anecdotal account:

Foreign artists such as the Bee Gees, Earth, Wind & Fire and Chicago influenced the musical style of VST & Company, at a time when disco music dominated the airwaves during the mid-to-late 1970s. The band became a regular performer on the noontime show Eat Bulaga!, hosted by the Sotto brothers (Tito, Vic) and Joey de Leon. The band's legacy is an attestment to their enduring popularity, as their hit songs continue to be played on the radio, and used in television and in film. In an interview with GMA Network News in 2008, songwriter Joey de Leon yearned to write new songs for VST & Co.

"Awitin Mo at Isasayaw Ko" (1978)
VST & Company's first major hit, and most recognizable disco anthem, "Awitin Mo at Isasayaw Ko" ("Sing and I Will Dance"), was not originally intended to be the group's first single. Composed by Vic Sotto and Joey de Leon, the song was actually the B-side to the ballad, "Ikaw ang Aking Mahal" ("You Are My Love"). Original song arranger, Lorrie Ilustre recalls its genesis:

VST Mania (1978-1982)
Upon the release of their debut album entitled "VST & Company (VST)", in 1978, it didn't take long for the record to be certified gold. The album ignited Philippine disco culture which led to "VST Mania": a phenomenal craze that quickly swept across the Philippines, turning the group into overnight celebrities. Roger Rigor comments on the ups and downs of fame:

The public's overwhelming response to VST's first album heralded the band's popular appeal and star potential. Roger Rigor recalls:

Their first major concert at Cebu Coliseum in Cebu City, was themed "Galactica"; meant to celebrate the box office popularity of the sci-fi epic, Star Wars: A New Hope. The band's primary members wore Darth Vader masks and matching black capes. The aftermath of the highly successful concert reflected band's immediate impact on Philippine pop culture.

Leaving the spotlight: "Coke Litro" Tour (1982-1983)
As the disco decade came to a close, VST & Company's last performance and public appearance as a band, would be during the nationwide Coca-Cola "Coke Litro" Tour. The promotional concert tour lasted an entire year, from 1982 to 1983. At the time the band quietly exited the entertainment industry, they had already completed five full-length albums filled with double platinum hits, and made three feature films.

The true meaning of "VST"
Speculation on the true meaning of the group's name has been debated for many decades. In early interviews by local magazines and newspapers, the group playfully suggested it to be: "Very, Secret, Talaga" ["Truly, Very, Secret"]. Although in recent years, it has been revealed that the acronym is simply the initialism of the first names of the group's three founding members: Vic (Sotto), Spanky (Rigor), and Tito (Sotto), as reported in a special by PTV evening show XIAOTIME in 2016, hosted by Xiao Chua, entitled: "VST & Co.: Kultura na Nagbubuklod sa Nasyong Pilipino".

During an interview on the Arnold Clavio Show in 2011, Clavio asked Tito Sotto if "VST" is an initialization of his full name, "Vicente Sotto the Third":

During VST's Anaheim concert on January 19, 2020, Roger Rigor jokingly hinted that VST meant, "Very, Secret, Talaga" ["Truly, Very, Secret"], referencing the answer they used to give the press during the band's heyday. Spanky Rigor then clarified that "VST" simply stands for, "Vic, Spanky, Tito":

Legacy and cultural impact
Ballet Philippines (2016)
For its 2016 Holiday Season presentation, the Cultural Center of the Philippines (CCP) premiered "Awitin Mo at Isasayaw Ko" on December 2, 2016: A dance musical collaboration between Ballet Philippines and ABS-CBN with the ABS-CBN Philharmonic Orchestra, conducted by Maestro Gerard Salonga, celebrating the music of VST & Company. Libretto by actress Bibeth Orteza, choreographery by Carissa Adea, James Laforteza, and PJ Rebullida, directed by BP artistic director Paul Alexander Morales. Featured singers and theater actors: Karylle, Michael Pangilinan, Markki Stroem, Kyle Echarri, Cooky Chua, Sandino Martin, Jef Flores, and Noel Comia Jr. Maestro Gerard Salonga comments:

Awit Award honors (2017)
VST & Company's generous contribution to Philippine music was acknowledged after receiving the "Dangal ng Musikang Pilipino" at the 30th Awit Award ceremonies of the Philippine Association of the Record Industry, on November 26, 2017.

Millennials Embrace the Music (2017)
In December 2017, the Adamson University Pep Squad won the annual UAAP Cheerdance Competition, dancing to the music of VST & Company for their winning performance routine at the Mall of Asia Arena. Male Rigor made a special appearance to celebrate with cheerful students at the ADU campus in Manila, where he performed 'Awitin Mo At Isasayaw Ko', during the celebratory bonfire. Male Rigor shares a tender moment in connecting with the younger generation:

ASAP Natin 'To Celebrates 40 Years of VST & Company
To celebrate VST & Company's 40th anniversary, ABS-CBN's longest-running Sunday noontime show, ASAP Natin 'To, opened their February 16, 2020, episode with a full musical tribute to VST & Company. The variety show's stars performed rearranged renditions VST hits: Gary Valenciano opened the show with "Magsayawan", followed by Zsa Zsa Padilla performing "Awitin Mo at Isasayaw Ko", along with Elha Nympha, Zephanie and Janine Berdin aka J.E.Z.. Ogie Alcasid performed "Step No, Step Yes", Martin Nievera and Billy Crawford did "Rock Baby, Rock". And for the finale, the entire cast closed with "Magsayawan".

Appearances and live performances
TVJ, Eat Bulaga "Dabarkads" (2015)
August 2015, TVJ (Tito Sotto, Vic Sotto, Joey de Leon) performed "Kiss... Kiss", "Ipagpatawad", and "Rock Baby Rock" on Eat Bulaga!.

Disco Manila (2016)
August 13, 2016: Spanky Rigor and Roger Rigor, along with Jet Montelibano of "Music and Magic" and the "Sounds of Manila" band, headlined "Disco Manila", as part of the Grand Performances Outdoor Summer Series in Downton Los Angeles; curated by DJ-host Joel Quizon, nephew of Filipino comedian Dolphy.

NYU Abu Dhabi (2016)
October 2016: Spanky Rigor and Roger Rigor performed in New York University Abu Dhabi with the members of "Disco Manila". The university extended an Artist-in-Residence invitation to the two US-based members of VST.

Stanford University (2018)
April 2018: Spanky Rigor and Roger Rigor performed at Stanford University's ‘Stanford Live’ performance series at the renowned Bing Concert Hall. Accompanied by the "Union Band", the show was a first for a Filipino act at the famed venue.

Ernst Community Cultural Center, Northern Virginia Community College (2018)
April 2018: Spanky Rigor, Roger Rigor, and Lorrie Ilustre performed at Ernst Community Cultural Center of the Northern Virginia Community College in Annandale, Virginia. Roger Rigor shared the highlights of the show:

City National Grove of Anaheim (2020)
January 19, 2020: The band, billed simply as "VST", performed in a sold-out concert at the City National Grove of Anaheim. The show featured the Rigor brothers (Spanky, Roger, and Male) and Celso Llarina. Musical direction by Lorrie Ilustre, the original arranger of "Awitin Mo at Isasayaw Ko", featuring a powerhouse band from Las Vegas: Pepe Jimenez (drums): Mamma Mia!, Cirque de Soliel, The Lion King, and Carlos Santana. Carlos Perez (percussion/vocals): with Ricky Martin since 1999. Pablo Gadda (acoustic and electric guitars): Las Vegas guitar legend. Monique Olivas (violin): Mary J. Blige, Toni Braxton, and Beyoncé. Timothy Bailey, Jr. (bass): Ariana Grande. Danny Falcon (trumpet): Celine Dion, and Lady Gaga. Eddie Rich (saxophone): Boyz II Men. The event was produced by Amore Entertainment.

Band members 
Original members
 Spanky Rigor
 Roger Rigor
 Male Rigor
 Celso Llarina
 Monet Gaskell
 Val Sotto
 Jun Medina
 Vic Sotto
Joey de Leon was also part of the band's creative process, although he is not officially listed as a member, he wrote "Ipagpatawad Mo" and "Awitin Mo at Isasayaw Ko", two of the band’s most popular songs. Brothers and co-founders Tito and Vic Sotto, became the  band's lead-vocalists as well. Many Filipino artists have contributed to VST & Company, such as Lorrie Ilustre from Hotdog, and Homer Flores.

Discography

Studio albums

Compilation albums
Awitin Mo at Isasayaw Ko (1994)
The Best of VST & Co. (2002)

Singles
"Ikaw ang Aking Mahal" / "Awitin Mo at Isasayaw Ko" (1978)
"Disco Fever" / "Magsayawan" (1978)
"Swing" / "Ayos Ba?" (1978)
"Rock Baby Rock" / "Ride On 'Ragsy'" (1979)
"Kiss Kiss" / "Step No, Step Yes" (1979)
"Merry Christmas (Para Sa Iyo)" / "Boogie Woogie Christmas Day" (1979)
"Magnifica" / "Etcetera" (1979)
"The Disco Rock" / "Puwede Ba" (1980)
"Ipakita Mo" / "Super Lover" (1980)
"Babay" / "Para Sa'yo" (1981)
"May I Have This Dance" (1981)

Filmography
During the late 1970s, Filipino director Al Quinn directed two feature films that showcased the songs of VST & Company as the films' soundtrack: Disco Fever (1978), starring Vilma Santos, Christopher de Leon, and Cocoy Laurel; and Swing It, Baby (1979), that top-billed Vilma Santos and Romeo Vasquez, with Tito, Vic and Joey, and other stars of the decade such as Amy Austria, Walter Navarro, Rolly Quizon, Sandy Garcia, Geleen Eugenio, Bing Davao and Mike Monserrat. It was in this film that VST & Company made their big-screen debut. Director Al Quinn recalls:

References

External links
VST official site

Manila sound groups
Musical groups established in 1977
Filipino pop music groups
Musical groups from Metro Manila
Vicor Music artists